Domen is a mountain on the Varanger Peninsula in eastern Troms og Finnmark county, Norway. Domen is bare and flat-topped, with a steep slope towards the Barents Sea below. The European route E75 highway runs along the western side of the mountain from Svartnes to Kiberg. The road is often closed in the winter due to bad weather.

Name
The Old Norse name of the Arctic Sea was Dumbshaf . This sea (haf) was named after the mountain Dumbr  (an old form of Domen). The name is probably related to the English word dumb, but in what meaning is unclear.

History and folklore
Domen is often associated with the witch trials in Finnmark during the 17th century. Vardø was the site of approximately 70 witch trials between 1601 and 1663. This was a large number, since there were only a couple of hundred inhabitants in the area at that time.

According to folklore, Vardø and Domen became infamous as the end of the world, Ultima Thule and the entrance to Hell was said to be somewhere around Domen or Vardø, and so witches flew to Domen to meet the devil for sabbath.

See also
Blockula
Vardø witch trials
Vardø witch trials (1621)

References

External links
Witchcraft in 17th-century Finnmark
The Witches' Sabbath At Yuletide
Walking In Witches' Footsteps

Mountains of_Troms og Finnmark
Vardø
Witchcraft in folklore and mythology
Witchcraft in Norway